The tar darkling beetles (Somaticus) are an Afrotropical genus of darkling beetles (Tenebrionidae). Adults are omnivorous scavengers, and the larvae, known as false wireworms, feed on plant roots. The larvae of several species are known to damage maize crops. The adults are matte black with longitudinal ridges on the pronotum and elytra, and may be covered in hairs of different colours.

Species include:
Somaticus aeneus Solier, 1843
Somaticus angulatus (Fahraeus)
Somaticus cinctus Haag-Rutenberg, 1873
Somaticus damarinus (Peringuey, 1904)
Somaticus distinctus Peringuey, 1892
Somaticus geniculatus
Somaticus haagi Peringuey, 1886
Somaticus metropolis
Somaticus spinosus Solier, 1843
Somaticus terricola 
Somaticus vestitus
Somaticus wahlbergi Haag-Rutenberg, 1873

References

Pimeliinae
Tenebrionidae genera
Beetles of Africa